Ichthyophis daribokensis, or Daribok's striped caecilian, is a species of amphibian found in Assam in northern India.

References

daribokensis
Amphibians of India